Avareh may refer to:

Avareh, Ilam
Avareh, Lorestan